No Place That Far is the second studio album by American country music artist Sara Evans. It was released in October 1998 via RCA Records Nashville. The album's first single, "Cryin' Game", peaked at number 56 on the US Billboard Hot Country Singles and Tracks chart; this single also included a non-album track entitled "Wait a Minute". The second single, its title track, became Evans' first number one hit on the US country charts. The third and final single from the album, "Fool, I'm a Woman" reached number 32. The album was certified gold by the Recording Industry Association of America (RIAA) for US sales of 500,000 copies.

The international version of No Place That Far included remixes of "Cryin' Game", "Fool, I'm a Woman", and "No Place That Far"; the latter excluded the backing vocals by Vince Gill which were featured on the American version. It also included two extra tracks, a remix of "Almost New" from the Clay Pigeons soundtrack and a cover of "I Only Have Eyes for You".

Track listing

Personnel 
From No Place That Far liner notes.

 Sara Evans – lead vocals 

Musicians
 John Hobbs – acoustic piano, Hammond B3 organ, synthesizers
 Randy McCormick – synthesizers
 Larry Byrom – acoustic guitar
 Jim Hurst – acoustic guitar
 B. James Lowry – acoustic guitar, gut-string guitar
 J.T. Corenflos – electric guitars, electric 12-string guitar
 Billy Sanford – electric guitars
 Sonny Garrish – steel guitar, dobro
 Larry Franklin – fiddle, mandolin
 Chris Carmichael – fiddle
 Larry Paxton – bass, six-string bass
 Eddie Bayers – drums, tambourine
 Lonnie Wilson – drums
 Terry McMillan – percussion

Background vocalists
 Ashley Evans
 Sara Evans
 Vince Gill
 Jim Hurst
 George Jones
 Alison Krauss
 Lesley Lyons
 Larry Marrs
 Liana Manis
 Martina McBride
 Jamie O'Hara
 Dan Tyminski
 Dennis Wilson
 Curtis Young

Production 
 Buddy Cannon – producer
 Norro Wilson – producer
 Billy Sherrill – recording, additional recording 
 Grahame Smith – recording assistant, additional recording assistant, digital editing 
 Scott McCutcheon – recording assistant
 J.R. Rodriguez – recording assistant
 Kelly Schoenfeld – additional recording assistant
 Brian Tankersley – mixing
 Sandy Jenkins – mix assistant 
 Hank Williams – mastering
 Shannon Finnegan – production coordinator 
 Mary Hamilton – art direction 
 Susan Eaddy – art direction 
 Julie Wance – design
 Andrew Eccles – photography 
 Mary Beth Felts – hair, make-up 
 Jennifer Kemp – stylist 
 Brenner Van Meter – management 
 Kip Krones – management

Studios
 Additional recording at The Music Mill and Sound Stage Studios (Nashville, Tennessee).
 Mixed at Seventeen Grand Recording (Nashville, Tennessee).
 Edited at Budro Music Repair Shop (Nashville, Tennessee).
 Mastered at MasterMix (Nashville, Tennessee).

Chart performance

Weekly charts

Year-end charts

Singles

Certifications

References

1998 albums
Sara Evans albums
RCA Records albums
Albums produced by Norro Wilson
Albums produced by Buddy Cannon